Abdullah Abdulkarim Al-Shamekh (born 28 May 1993) is a football player who currently plays as a left back for Al-Fayha.

Career

International
He made his debut for the Saudi Arabia national football team on 21 March 2019 in a friendly against United Arab Emirates. He scored his first international goal 4 days later in a friendly against Equatorial Guinea.

Career statistics

Club

International goals
Scores and results list Saudi Arabia's goal tally first.

Honours
Al-Hilal
King Cup: 2015

References

External links
 
 

1993 births
Living people
Sportspeople from Riyadh
Association football fullbacks
Saudi Arabian footballers
Saudi Arabia youth international footballers
Saudi Arabia international footballers
Al Hilal SFC players
Al-Raed FC players
Al-Wehda Club (Mecca) players
Al-Shabab FC (Riyadh) players
Al-Fayha FC players
Saudi Professional League players
Footballers at the 2014 Asian Games
Asian Games competitors for Saudi Arabia
21st-century Saudi Arabian people
20th-century Saudi Arabian people